Oscar or Oskar is a masculine given name of Irish origin.

Etymology
The name is derived from two elements in Irish: the first, os, means "deer"; the second element, car, means "loving" or "friend", thus "deer-loving one" or "friend of deer". The name is borne by a character in Irish mythology—Oscar, grandson of Fionn Mac Cumhaill, and refers to his descent from his grandmother, Sadhbh, who was enchanted into the form of a deer.

The name was popularised in the 18th century by Scottish poet James Macpherson, creator of 'Ossianic poetry'. Today the name is associated with Scandinavia because Napoleon was an admirer of Macpherson's work and gave the name to his godson, Joseph Bernadotte, who later became Oscar I, King of Sweden. Consequently, at the time many Swedes were named Oscar. The name was given to more than a half-dozen members of Scandinavian royal houses. Oscar was the third most popular name for males born in Sweden in 2013 and is ranked 51 in terms of the most popular male names in Sweden.

The surname McCusker originates as an Anglicised form of the Irish Mac Oscair as does the anglicised surname Cosgrave. There is alternative speculation that it may be derived from the Old Norse cognate Ásgeirr (a personal name itself composed of the elements meaning "god" and "spear").

Cognates
Austrian German, Croatian, Czech, Estonian, Finnish, German, Norwegian, Polish, Scandinavian, Slovenian, Swedish, Swiss German: Oskar.
Icelandic: Óskar.
Catalan: Òscar.
Danish, Dutch, English, French, Irish, Italian, Norwegian, Portuguese, Swedish: Oscar.
Spanish: Óscar.
Finnish: Oskari, Okko, Osku (a pet form of Oskari).
Hungarian: Oszkár
Latin: Anscharius.
Latvian: Oskars.
Lithuanian: Oskaras.
Scottish Gaelic: Osgar.
Gaeilge: Osgar/Osgur.

People with the given name Oscar
 Oscar (footballer, born 1954), José Oscar Bernardi, Brazilian footballer
 Oscar (footballer, born 1991), Oscar dos Santos Emboaba Júnior, Brazilian footballer
 Oscar I of Sweden (1799–1859), King of Sweden and Norway
 Oscar II of Sweden (1829–1907), King of Sweden and Norway
 Oscar Albayalde (born 1963), Filipino retired police officer
 Prince Oscar Bernadotte (1859–1953), Swedish prince and admiral
 Oscar Brodney (1907–2008), American lawyer and screenwriter
 Oscar Bronner (born 1943), Austrian journalist and painter
 Oscar Coggins (born 1999), Hong Kong triathlon athlete
 Oscar Cortínez (born 1973), Argentine marathon runner
 Oscar Feltsman (1921–2013), Soviet-Ukrainian composer
 Oscar Fernandes (1941-2021), Indian politician
 Oscar Lorenzo Fernández (1897–1948), Brazilian composer
 Oscar Gamble (1949–2018), American baseball player
 Oscar Grant (1986–2009), African American fatally shot by police
 Oscar Hammerstein I (1846–1919), German-American businessman and theatre impresario
 Oscar Hammerstein II (1895–1960), American songwriter and musical director
 Oscar Han (1891–1976), Romanian sculptor and writer
 Oscar Hijuelos (1951–2013), Cuban-American novelist
 Oscar Holmes (1916–2001), first African-American Naval Aviator and air traffic controller
 Oscar De La Hoya (born 1973), American boxer and boxing promoter
 Oscar Isaac (born 1979), American actor
 Oscar Jacobson (1882–1966), Swedish-born American painter and museum curator
 Oscar James (born 1942), Trinidadian actor
 Oscar Kahl (born 1997), Thai football player
 Oscar Krokstedt (1908–1985), Swedish Navy vice admiral
 Oscar Levant (1906–1972, American pianist, composer, author, comedian, and actor)
 Oscar Lloyd (born 1997), British actor
 Oscar Malapitan (born 1955), Filipino politician
 Oscar Niemeyer (1907–2012), Brazilian architect
 Oscar Peterson (1925–2007), Canadian jazz pianist and composer
 Oscar Piastri (born 2001), Australian racing driver
 Oscar Pistorius (born 1986), South African convicted murderer and ex-Olympic sprinter
 Oscar Raise (born 1952), Italian high jumper
 Oscar Randal-Williams (born 1984) British mathematician
 Oscar van Rappard (1896–1962), Dutch footballer and hurdler
 Oscar de la Renta (1932–2014), Dominican-American fashion designer
 Oscar Robertson (born 1938), American basketball player
 Oscar Luigi Scalfaro (1918–2012), Italian politician
 Ossie Schectman (1919–2013), American basketball player who scored the first basket in National Basketball Association history
 Oscar Schmidt (born 1958), Brazilian basketball player
 Oscar J. Smith (1859–1937), American lawyer and politician
 Oscar Strático (born 1956), Argentine judoka and wrestler
 Oscar Traynor (1886–1963), Irish politician
 Oscar Tshiebwe (born 1999), Congolese basketball player
 Oscar Wendt (born 1985), Swedish football player
 Oscar Wilde (1854–1900), Irish writer and poet
 Oscar Lawton Wilkerson (1926-2023), American pilot

People with the given name Oskar
 Prince Oskar of Prussia (1888–1958), German Prince (Prince of Prussia)
 Oskar Alexander (1876–1953), Croatian painter
 Oskar Anderson (1887–1960), German-Russian mathematician
 Oskar Andersson (1877–1906), Swedish cartoonist
 Oskar Angelus (1892–1979), Estonian politician
 Oskar Backlund (1846–1916), Swedish-Russian astronomer
 Oskar Baum (1883–1941), Czech music educator and writer
 Oskar Deutsch (born 1963), Austrian entrepreneur and President of the Jewish Community of Vienna 
 Oskar Dirlewanger (1895–1945), German military officer and war criminal of Nazi Germany
 Oskar Enkvist (1849–1912), Russian admiral
 Oskar Fischer (disambiguation), multiple people
 Oskar Gröning (1921 – 2018), German SS Unterscharführer at the Auschwitz concentration camp
 Oskar Heil (1908–1994), German electrical engineer and inventor
 Oskar Hoffmann (1851–1912), Baltic-German painter
 Oskar Homolka (1898–1978), Austrian film and theatre actor
 Oskar von Hutier (1857–1934), German military commander
 Óskar Jónasson, Icelandic film director and screenwriter
 Oskar Kallas (1868–1946), Estonian diplomat, linguist and folklorist
 Oskar Kallis (1892–1918), Estonian painter
 Oskar Kaplur (1889–1962), Estonian wrestler
 Oskar Kirmes (born 1995), Finnish artistic gymnast
 Oskar Klein (1894–1977), Swedish physicist
 Oskar Kokoschka (1886–1980), Austrian-British-Swiss artist, poet and playwright
 Oskar Kolberg (1814–1890), Polish ethnographer, folklorist, and composer
 Oskar Lafontaine (born 1943), German politician
 Oskar Loorits (1900–1961), Estonian folklorist
 Oskar Luts (1887–1953), Estonian writer
 Oskar Matute (born 1972), Basque politician
 Oskar Merikanto (1868–1924), Finnish musician and composer
 Oskar Morgenstern (1902–1977), Austrian-American economist
 Oskar Nedbal (1874–1930), Czech violist, composer, and conductor
 Oskar Osala (born 1987), Finnish ice hockey player
 Oskar Painter, Canadian physicist
 Oskar Pfungst (1874–1933), German biologist and psychologist
 Oskar Potiorek (1853–1933), Austro-Hungarian military commander
 Oskar Roehler (born 1959), German film director
 Oskar Schindler (1908–1974), German industrialist, spy and humanitarian
 Oskar Schlemmer (1888–1943), German painter, sculptor, designer and choreographer
 Panda Eyes (born 1996), Oskar Steinbeck, Swiss DJ and music producer
 Oskar Vogt (1870–1959), German physician and neurologist

People with the given name Oskari
 Oskari Friman (1893–1933), Finnish wrestler
 Oskari Frösén (born 1976), Finnish high jumper
 Oskari Mantere (1874–1942), Finnish politician
 Oskari Mörö (born 1993), Finnish hurdler
 Oskari Rissanen (1893–1957), Finnish runner
 Oskari Tokoi (1873-1963), Finnish politician

People with the given name Oszkár
 Oszkár Frey (born 1953), Hungarian canoer
 Oszkár Gerde (1883-1944), Hungarian 2x Olympic champion sabre fencer
 Oszkár Nagy (1893–1965), Hungarian painter

People with the given name Óscar
 Óscar Marcelino Álvarez (1948–2016), Argentine football player
 Óscar Álvarez (cyclist) (born 1977), Colombian cyclist
 Óscar Álvarez (footballer) (born 1977), Spanish football player
 Óscar Alzaga (born 1942), Spanish jurist, academic and politician
 Óscar Chinchilla (born 1969), Guatemalan politician
 Óscar David Álvarez (born 1983), Colombian golfer
 Óscar de Marcos (born 1989), Spanish footballer
 Óscar Fernández (fencer) (born 1962), Spanish fencer
 Óscar Fernández (athlete) (born 1974), Spanish runner
 Óscar Fernández (football manager) (born 1974), Spanish football coach
 Óscar Fernández (judoka) (born 1978), Spanish judoka
 Óscar Freire (born 1976), Spanish cyclist
 Óscar Pereiro (born 1977), Spanish cyclist
 Óscar Romero (1917–1980), saint and Salvadoran Archbishop
 Óscar Sevilla (born 1976), Spanish cyclist
 Óscar Téllez (born 1975), Spanish football player
 Óscar Valdez (born 1990), Mexican professional boxer
 Óscar Vargas (cyclist) (born 1964), Colombian cyclist
 Óscar Vargas (footballer) (born 1980), Honduran footballer
 Óscar Vega (born 1965), Spanish boxer
 Óscar Villarreal (born 1981), American baseball player

Fictional characters with the given name Oscar or Oskar
 Oscar the Grouch, a Muppet on Sesame Street
 Oscar (Irish mythology), the warrior son of Oisín and Niamh
 Oscar Bluth, a character on the television series Arrested Development
 Oscar François de Jarjayes, a woman raised as a man on the anime series The Rose of Versailles
 Oscar Goldman, a character on The Six Million Dollar Man and The Bionic Woman
 Oscar Madison, a character on The Odd Couple
 Oscar Martinez (The Office)
 Oscar Osborne, a character on Hollyoaks
 Oscar Shales, a character on the television series Prison Break
 Oskar Schell, the protagonist in the novel Extremely Loud & Incredibly Close
 Old Oscar, a biplane on Jay Jay the Jet Plane
 Oscar, a Lance Knight character in the video game Fire Emblem: Path of Radiance
 Oscar, a lion in the Ice Age movies
 Oscar, a fish in Shark Tale
 Oscar, Captain Tangent's parrot on WordGirl
 Oskar Eriksson, the protagonist in the novel Let the Right One In
 Oscar Fishtooth, a character on Fish Hooks
 Oskar Greason, a character from the animated series Star vs. the Forces of Evil
 Oscar Hidalgo, a character in Ang Probinsyano
 Oscar, the titular character on cartoon series Oscar's Oasis
 Oscar Pine, a character in the animated web series RWBY

See also
List of Irish-language given names
Oskarsson, which also includes Oscarsson and Óskarsson

References

Danish masculine given names
English masculine given names
English-language masculine given names
Estonian masculine given names
German masculine given names
Icelandic masculine given names
Irish masculine given names
Irish-language masculine given names
Norwegian masculine given names
Scandinavian masculine given names
Swedish masculine given names
Spanish masculine given names

sk:Oskar